Kaka Ji: Son of Royal Sardar is a 2019 Indian-Punjabi drama film written by Gill Raunta and directed by Mandeep Benipal. Associate director  Vinod Kumar. Produced by Dreamreality Movies and Ravneet Chahal; it stars Dev Kharoud, Aarushi Sharma, and Jagjeet Sandhu in lead roles. In the film a young man rethinks his involvement in a gang after falling in love. The film was released worldwide on 18 January 2019.

Plot 
Kaka ji A man decides to rethink his decision of joining a gang after he falls in love with a girl

Cast 

 Dev Kharoud
 Aarushi Sharma
 Jagjeet Sandhu
 Dheeraj Kumar
 Lucky Dhaliwal
 Anita Meeta
 Parkash Gadhu
 Gurmeet Saajan

Soundtrack

Soundtrack of the film is composed by Laddi Gill, Gurmeet Singh and Ikwinder Singh.

Reception 
Gurleen of Ghaint Punjab wrote, "This Kakaji was a major disappointment!". Dixit Bhargav of Punjabi Mania wrote, "The best part about the movie was its music. Had it not been a movie, it would have unequivocally been a successful music album.". Shubham Bahukhandi of Dekh News wrote, "You all can watch the Punjabi movie Kaka Ji for sure and we think that you all are going to love it. Also, the production and the directional work is really nice in the film and we think that the viewers are going to appreciate this film for sure." Jasmine Singh of The Tribune wrote, "In fact, KakaJi is a film that has uselessly stretched comic scenes that after a point they are unbearable, what was on director’s mind when he was shooting those scenes."

References

External links 

 

2019 films
Punjabi-language Indian films
2010s Punjabi-language films
Indian romantic drama films
2019 romantic drama films
Films scored by Gurmeet Singh
Films scored by Laddi Gill